Serbian Cultural and Educational Society "Grow" of Teslić, known simply as SPKD "Prosvjeta" Teslić re-established in 1991 is the main carrier of cultural events in Teslic, and it gathers a large number of intellectuals, educators and youths. The society is managed by a chamber consisting of 7 members, all led by the president Zivko Petrovic-Kiko.

Activities

They are known for carrying out special events in Teslic, such as: Svetosavske Joy, Beloved City, Autumn Days of Culture, and 'Sabor' Serbian Folk Creativity Festival. Also, Beloved City appeared as a gratitude to the Patron Saint of Teslic, and it's carried each year in the 'Branislav Nusic' Amateur Drama Theatre, where the members of the society are performing acting shows, dances, and singing. In addition, they also organise an art exhibition known for its artworks.

Also, for the past couple of years, they organize the Spiritual Academy Event in cooperation with St. Sava Youth Community.

At the same time, Autumn Days of Culture is a traditional event that SPKD Prosvjeta have been organised for fifteen years and which runs from September to December, during which there are carried out a multitude of cultural events from various fields.

Although, their biggest achievement is the Serbian Folk Creativity Festival which gathers around a big number of participants, altogether visiting the Serbian Parliament twice a year. They have organised the event for 35 times.

Nevertheless, their favourite event is Saint Sava's Sunday which has been carried out for 18 years in Teslic, and they try to enrich it and making it more interesting every year.

In addition to the traditional events, SPKD Prosvjeta is also organising every year:
 7 art exhibitions;
 10 folklore events;
 5 book promotions;
 8 sales exhibitions of books.

All these activities are made possible due to their numerous members within the society:
 80 members in Teslic;
 30 members in Viktovci;
 ~50 members in Pribnic and Đulić;
 15 members within the art department.

Cooperation

SPKD is known for its beautiful cooperation with the St. Sava Youth Community, the National Library `Danilo Kis` from Teslic and the 'Branislav Nusic' Amateur Drama Theater.

Also, good cooperation has been established with every primary and secondary school in Teslic, enriching kid's culture every year.

Facilities

Their library is available at any time, especially for pensioners and students. It must be mentioned the fact that you must need a membership to visit it.

At the same time, their museological setting has been visited by a large number of teslicans, especially by the youth.

Purposes

Beside promoting the Serbian culture, they are very keen on preserving the Cyrillic alphabet as the main alphabet used in Teslic, and they take on every opportunity of doing so.

Members of the chamber

 Borislav Predojević
 Zarko Jovicic
 Teso Ristić
 Radomir Jokic
 Vidosava Pavlović
 Vojislav Jovananić
 Boško Manojlovic

Members of the committee

 Aleksa Kasapović
 Boško Mišić
 Miodrag Marković
 Vukman Krgović
 Zdravko Trivunović
 Dušanka Lukonić
 Milorad Marković
 Savo Knezevic
 Nedo Kovačević
 Bogomir Đukić
 Vojislav Jovanić
 Miroslav Popović
 Zoran Vasojević
 Radisav Ristić
 Radomir Jokic
 Milorad Simic
 Brane Peulić
 Stojan Šajinović
 Gordana Anđelić
 Zdravko Jelic
 Borislav Predojev ic
 Dusan Kuzmanovic
 Lazo Ristić
 Miodrag Gačić
 Darinka Bogdanić
 Zaga Gavric
 Tešo Ristić
 Zdravko Ostojic
 Zeljko Vukovic
 Miro Đukarić, archpriest-stavrofor
 Slavoljub Petricevic
 Vidosava Pavlović
 Živko Petrović
 Aleksandra Jotanović
 Jovičić Žarko
 Boško Manojlovic
 Cedo Grbic
 Momčilo Gotovac
 Ljubo Pozderović
 Mika Smiljić
 Milica Jovic
 Adam Bogdanić
 Milorad Malbašić
 Anđelija Panic
 Mile Brkic

Organizations based in Republika Srpska
Organizations established in 1991